Rouffiac may refer to the following places in France:

Rouffiac, Cantal, a commune in the department of Cantal
Rouffiac, Charente, a commune in the department of Charente
Rouffiac, Charente-Maritime, a commune in the department of Charente-Maritime
Rouffiac, Tarn, a commune in the department of Tarn
Rouffiac-d'Aude, a commune in the department of Aude
Rouffiac-des-Corbières, a commune in the department of Aude
Rouffiac-Tolosan, a commune in the department of Haute-Garonne
 Chateau de Rouffiac, Angoisse, Dordogne